Mahfuza Khanam is a Bangladeshi academic and social activist. She is the current president of Asiatic Society of Bangladesh since January 2018. She was awarded Begum Rokeya Padak (2012) and Anannya Top Ten Awards (2013).

Career
While Khanam was a student of the University of Dhaka, she served as the vice-president of Dhaka University Central Students' Union (DUCSU). In 2009, Khanam served as the General Secretary of Asiatic Society of Bangladesh.

Khanam served as the director general of Directorate of Secondary and Higher Education. She served as the chairperson of Khelaghar Ashor, an organisation for children. She is also the president of several organisations including Manikganj Samity in Dhaka, Peshajibi Nari Samaj (Professional Women Society) and Federation of World Teachers' Association (FWTA). She is a vice-president on the executive committee of the Itihas Academy. She also served as 15th Principal of Manikgonj Gov't Women's College, Manikgonj.

Award
Begum Mahfuza Khanom was awarded for Ekushey Padak (it is the second highest civilian award in Bangladesh, introduced in memory of the martyrs of the Bengali Language Movement of 1952 The award is given to recognize contributions in a number of fields, including culture, education, and economics.) In 2021, The Ministry of Cultural Affairs administers the award 21 distinguished citizens of the country for outstanding contributions in their respective fields. She got the award for the contribution in Education.

Personal life
Khanam was born to Mustafizur Rahman Khan and Saleha Khanam. She is married to Shafique Ahmed, a barrister and a former minister of law.

References

Living people
University of Dhaka alumni
Academic staff of the University of Dhaka
Bangladeshi women activists
Recipients of Begum Rokeya Padak
Year of birth missing (living people)
Recipients of the Ekushey Padak